Arthur Leonard Downes (27 May 1895 – 1 August 1984) was a New Zealand soldier, clerk, salesman and policeman. He was born in Warwick, Warwickshire, England, on 27 May 1895.

He died in Wellington in 1984 and was buried at Akatarawa Cemetery.

References

1895 births
1984 deaths
New Zealand police officers
New Zealand military personnel
British emigrants to New Zealand
Burials at Akatarawa Cemetery